Anolis cymbops, Cope's Veracruz anole, is a species of lizard in the family Dactyloidae. The species is found in Mexico.

References

Anoles
Endemic reptiles of Mexico
Reptiles described in 1864
Taxa named by Edward Drinker Cope